Nemacheilus jordanicus is a species of ray-finned fish in the family Balitoridae.
It is found in Israel, Jordan, and Syria.
Its natural habitat is rivers and it is threatened by habitat loss.

References

jordanicus
Fish described in 1982
Taxonomy articles created by Polbot